Olho d'Água Grande is a municipality located in the Brazilian state of Alagoas. Its population is 5,128 (2020) and its area is 119 km².

References

Municipalities in Alagoas